Calle Clang (born 20 May 2002) is a Swedish professional ice hockey goaltender who currently plays for Rögle BK of the Swedish Hockey League (SHL) while under contract as a prospect to the Anaheim Ducks of the National Hockey League (NHL). Clang was selected by the Pittsburgh Penguins in the third round of the 2020 NHL Entry Draft.

Professional

Pittsburgh Penguins
Clang’s NHL rights were held by the Penguins until March 21, 2022, when Clang, along with forwards Zach Aston-Reese and Dominik Simon, and a second-round pick in the 2022 NHL Entry Draft, was traded by Pittsburgh to the Anaheim Ducks in exchange for forward Rickard Rakell at the trade deadline.

Anaheim Ducks
On May 5, 2022, Clang was signed to a three-year entry-level contract by the Ducks.

References

External links
 

2002 births
Living people
Kristianstads IK players
People from Olofström Municipality
Pittsburgh Penguins draft picks
Rögle BK players
Swedish ice hockey goaltenders
Sportspeople from Blekinge County
21st-century Swedish people